Assadullah Sarwari (Pashtu: اسد الله سروري) is an Afghan former politician and convicted war criminal who belonged to the Khalq faction of the communist People's Democratic Party of Afghanistan (PDPA). He was born in Ghazni Province.

Career
Educated in the Soviet Union, he served as an air force pilot under the monarchy of Mohammed Zahir Shah, and later as the air force garrison commander under President Mohammed Daoud Khan in 1973. 

When the Communist government took over he was appointed head of the Afghan Security Service (AGSA) in 1978 and continued to serve until he was replaced by Hafizullah Amin's nephew, Asadullah Amin in October 1979.

In September 1979 Sarwari was involved in a pro-Nur Muhammad Taraki plot to oust Prime Minister Hafizullah Amin. After the failure of the plot, he and his comrades (the 'Gang of Four') escaped to the Soviet Embassy, where he was given asylum until the Soviet invasion and the fall of Amin in December 1979.

After the invasion, under the government of Babrak Karmal, Sarwari was first given the task of deputy prime minister, but he was soon removed from the government and posted as ambassador to Mongolia from 1980 to 1986. In January 1980, Sarwari also became a member of the PDPA Politburo. In 1981, he was stripped of membership in the PDPA Politburo and was expelled from the party's Central Committee five years later in July 1986. President Mohammad Najibullah appointed him as ambassador to East Germany until 1988 and then South Yemen in 1989.

Sarwari was expelled from the party following his alleged role in support of Shahnawaz Tanai's coup attempt in 1990.

In May 1992, after the collapse of the Communist regime, Sarwari was arrested by the Shura-e Nazar militia of Ahmad Shah Massoud and was kept in detention in Panjshir. In 2005 he was transferred to the National Directorate of Security (NDS).

Death sentence and imprisonment
On December 25, 2005, he was charged with the involvement in the arbitrary arrest, torture and mass killing of hundreds of opponents during his tenure as head of Afghan intelligence for a period of one year. On February 25, 2006, he was sentenced to death by firing squad for ordering the killing of over 400 people; he was cleared of charges involving conspiracy against the post-Communist government. His was the first trial involving war crimes in Afghanistan in the post-Taliban era. The proceedings of the trial were condemned by the Amnesty International as "grossly unfair".

Reuters reported that he received a death sentence in January 2006. In 2008 a court of appeal commuted his sentence to 19 years' imprisonment. He was released from jail in January 2017.

References

External links
Assadullah Sarwari at Trial Watch.

1930 births
Living people
Afghan military personnel
Communist government ministers of Afghanistan
Ambassadors of Afghanistan to Mongolia
Afghan expatriates in the Soviet Union
People's Democratic Party of Afghanistan politicians
People granted political asylum in the Soviet Union
Afghan military officers